María Negroni (born 1951 in Rosario, Argentina) is an Argentinian poet, essayist, novelist and translator.

She graduated from Columbia University, with a PhD in Latin American Literature.
She teaches at Sarah Lawrence College. She was a visiting professor at New York University, in 2008.

Awards
 International Prize for Essay Writing from Siglo XXI
 2002 PEN Award for best book of poetry in translation, for Islandia
 2000-2001 Octavio Paz Fellowship for Poetry
 1997 Argentine National Book Award, for El viaje de la noche 
 1994 Guggenheim Fellowships

Works
De tanto desolar Libros de Tierra Firme, 1985
La jaula bajo el trapo, (1991); Editorial Cuarto Propio, 1999, 
El viaje de la noche Lumen, 1994, 
Night Journey, Translator Anne Twitty, Princeton University Press, 2002, 
Diario Extranjero Pequena Venecia, 2000, 
La ineptitud Alción Editora, 2002
Islandia (1994)
Islandia: a poem, Translator Anne Twitty, Station Hill / Barrytown, Ltd., 2001,

Essays
Ciudad gótica Bajo la Luna Nueva, 1994, ; Bajo la Luna, 2007, 
El testigo lúcido: la obra de sombra de Alejandra Pizarnik, Beatriz Viterbo Editora, 2003, 
Museo negro, Grupo Editorial Norma, 1999, 
Galería fantástica, Siglo XXI, 2009,

Novels
 El sueño de Ursula Seix Barral, 1998, 
 La anunciación Emecé Editores / Seix Barral, 2007,

References

External links
"Maria Negroni", Sarah Lawrence magazine, Sophia Kelley, Fall 2009

1951 births
Living people
Argentine women poets
People from Rosario, Santa Fe
Columbia Graduate School of Arts and Sciences alumni
Sarah Lawrence College faculty
New York University faculty